Jadesola Olayinka Akande (CON, OFR) (15 November 1940 – 29 April 2008) was a Nigerian lawyer, author and academic who is regarded as the first Nigerian female professor of Law.

Early life and education
Akande Jadesola Olayinka was born on 15,November 1940, in Ibadan, Oyo State,defunct Western Region of Nigeria. Akande Jadesola Olayinka completed her nursery, basic and secondary school education at Ibadan People's Girls School and St. Annes School respectively. She obtained her G.C.E Advanced Level certificate after attending Barnstaple Girls Grammar School, Devon, England before proceeding to study a course in Law at the University College, London where she graduated in 1963.

Career
After her call to the bar at the Inner Temple, London and the Nigerian Law School,  Akande Jadesola returned to Nigeria where she began her career as an Administrative Ofiicer in the West Regional Civil Service. Akande Jadesola was a key member of the Constitutional Review Committee of 1987, and the Presidential Panel of National Security in 2000.

In April 1989,  Akande Jadesola Olayinka was appointed as the second Vice-Chancellor of Lagos State University, a position she held till 1993, after quitting as a lecturer at the University of Lagos. In 2000, she was appointed the Pro-Chancellor of the Federal University of Technology, Akure until 2004.She was a key member of the Constitutional Review Committee of 1987 and the Presidential Panel of National Security in 2000. Her wealth of experience was second to none. As a mother and human rights activist,

Works

Honours and accolades
Commander of the Order of the Niger (CON) – 1998
National Honour of the Order of the Niger (OFR) – 2002

References

External links
Tribute on The Nation

1940 births
2008 deaths
People from Ibadan
Nigerian women lawyers
Academic staff of Lagos State University
Academic staff of the University of Lagos
Academic staff of the Federal University of Technology Akure
Alumni of University College London
Nigerian women academics
Vice-Chancellors of Lagos State University
Nigerian Law School alumni
Commanders of the Order of the Niger
Nigerian expatriates in the United Kingdom
20th-century women lawyers
Women heads of universities and colleges
St Anne's School, Ibadan alumni
 Yoruba people